Tuscan Springs is a spring in the U.S. state of California.

Tuscan Springs was named for the fact its borax-impregnated waters were chemically similar to the springs of Tuscany, in Italy.

References

Springs of California
Rivers of Tehama County, California